Practical Magic is a 1995 novel by Alice Hoffman. The book was adapted into a 1998 film of the same name. Hoffman has since published two prequel novels, The Rules of Magic (2017) and Magic Lessons (2020), as well as one sequel, The Book of Magic (2021).

Plot summary
For more than two hundred years, the Owens women have been blamed for everything that has gone wrong in their Massachusetts town. Gillian and Sally have also endured that fate: As children, the sisters were forever outsiders, taunted, talked about, pointed at. Their elderly aunts almost seemed to encourage the whispers of witchery, with their darkened house, their love concoctions and their crowd of black cats. All Gillian and Sally wanted to do was escape. One would do so by marrying, the other by running away. But the bonds they shared brought them back to each other, and to the magic they could not escape.

References

1995 American novels
1995 fantasy novels
American fantasy novels adapted into films
Novels set in Massachusetts
Works about sisters